The Master of the Children of the Chapel Royal was the choirmaster of the Chapel Royal of England. They were responsible for the musical direction of the choir, which consisted of the Gentlemen of the Chapel and Children of the Chapel. In some periods regarded as the most prestigious choral directorship in the country, the holder was given power to take boys into service from the leading cathedral choirs.

Description 

As well as singing in divine service in the chapel, in Tudor times the Masters of the Children were also involved in staging plays with the choristers. Initially these were for the entertainment of the Royal Court, but by Elizabethan times were taking place in theatres for the paying public. This culminated in the Clifton Star Chamber Case when the then Master of the Children, Nathaniel Giles, allowed his warrant for recruiting choir boys to be used for legal abduction of a nobleman's son to act in a theatre in which he had a financial stake. Following this case the practice declined.

Upon the restoration of the monarchy in 1660, Henry Cooke, commonly known as Captain Cooke, who had been a soldier in the Civil War, was appointed Master of the Children and reconstituted the choir. There followed a period of excellence in the choir of the Chapel Royal, with many of the boys under his tutelage in those years become famous musicians such as Pelham Humfrey, Henry Purcell, John Blow and Michael Wise.

List of office holders 

 1444 John Plummer
 1455 Henry Abyngdon
 1478 Gilbert Banester
 1486 Lawrence Squier
 1493 William Newark
 1509 William Cornysh
 1526 William Crane
 1545 Richard Bower
 1561 Richard Edwardes
 1566 William Hunnis
 1569 Richard Farrant 
 1597 Nathaniel Giles
 1633 Thomas Day
 1654 Vacant
 1660 Henry Cooke
 c1672 Pelham Humfrey
 1674 John Blow
 1708 William Croft
 1727 Bernard Gates
 1757 James Nares
 1780 Edmund Ayrton
 1805 John Stafford Smith
 1817 William Hawes
 1846 Thomas Helmore

References

Notes 

Anglican church music
English choral conductors
Classical music in the United Kingdom
History of the Church of England
Positions within the British Royal Household